Mountjoy Priory was a priory in Norfolk, England.

Monasteries in Norfolk